Seating may refer to:

General plans:
 Seating plan

In theaters or stadiums:
 Bleacher seating
 Chanin's seating plan
 Club seating
 Continental seating
 Festival seating
 General seating
 Home theater seating
 Movable seating
 Reserved seating
 Seating assignment
 Seating capacity
 Social seating
 Stadium seating
 Theatre seating

In transportation:
 2+2 (seating arrangement)
 Airline seating chart
 Bucket seating
 Car seating
 Herringbone seating
 Indian Railways seating
 Side-by-side seating
 Third row seating

In legislative bodies:
 Seating of the United States House of Representatives
 Alberta Legislature seating plan
 British Columbia Legislature Seating Plan
 Manitoba Legislature Seating Plan
 Nova Scotia Legislature Seating Plan
 Ontario Legislative Assembly seating plan
 Saskatchewan Legislature Seating Plan

In business:
 American Seating
 American Seating Company Factory Complex
 Recaro Aircraft Seating
 Magna Seating
 Thompson Aero Seating

In entertainment:
 Seating Arraignment

See also
 Picnic table
 Seat
 Kids' table